Hamilton is a large town in south-western Victoria, Australia, at the intersection of the Glenelg Highway and the Henty Highway. The Hamilton Highway connects it to Geelong.

Hamilton is in the federal Division of Wannon, and is in the Southern Grampians local government area.

Hamilton claims to be the "Wool Capital of the World", based on its strong historical links to sheep grazing which continue today. The town uses the tagline "Greater Hamilton: one place, many possibilities".

History

Early history
Hamilton was built near the border of three traditional indigenous tribal territories: the Gunditjmara land that stretches south to the coast, the Tjapwurong land to the north east and the Bunganditj territory to the west. People who lived in these areas tended to be settled rather than nomadic. The region is fertile and well-watered, leading to an abundance of wildlife, and no need to travel far for food.  Physical remains such as the weirs and fish traps found in Lake Condah to the south of Hamilton, as well as accounts of early white settlers support local indigenous oral histories of well-established settlements in the area.

British colonisation
On 12 September 1836, the explorer, Major Thomas Mitchell was the first European to travel through the region.  His reports of the fertility and abundance of ‘Australia Felix’ (as he called this region of Western Victoria) encouraged pastoralists to move to the area and set up large sheep runs.  In 1839, squatter Charles Wedge and his brothers arrived in the area and established ‘The Grange' sheep station upon the banks of the Grange Burn rivulet where the town of Hamilton now stands.

There soon followed significant conflict between Wedge's men and the local Aboriginal people. Wedge reported attacks on his shepherds and the loss of hundreds of sheep and other livestock. In 1840, the killing of Patrick Codd, who had been employed on The Grange, led to at least three separate punitive expeditions which resulted in the deaths of more than ten Aborigines. Wedge infamously had a swivel gun mounted outside his homestead to deter the Indigenous people from approaching and he claimed that the "depredations did not cease till many lives were sacrificed".

The "frequent collisions" compelled the squatters of the area to request protection from the Government. In 1842 temporary protection came from troopers of the Native Police under Captain Henry Dana and from the Border Police under Captain Foster Fyans. The police magistrate from Portland James Blair and the new position of police magistrate to The Grange, Acheson French were also appointed by Governor Charles Latrobe to "check the collision between the natives and the settlers".

Birth of the town
The proximity of The Grange to other properties and to important tracks between Portland and New South Wales led to the gradual emergence of a small town.  This included an inn, blacksmith, a small store and some shanties and businesses nearby.  The site was a small social centre for surrounding pastoral properties, with horse races being held along the Grange Burn flat.
A Post Office opened on 1 July 1844 (Hamilton from 1 January 1854).

The desire for a school prompted a town survey that commenced in 1849. The township of Hamilton was formally declared in 1851. The town was named in the following way as quoted by the book, "Dundas Shire Centenary 1863-1963", page 58. Quote: "In 1840, owing to police difficulties in controlling public houses on, or not on the imaginary boundary line, Henry Wade was sent from Sydney on a special mission to mark out the boundary. He completed the survey as far as Serviceton by the spring of 1847, and was then appointed District Surveyor and in 1850, laid out a township for the Grange, which he named Hamilton. It was then the prerogative of the surveyor to christen his lay-out. Wade and his family had made close friends of the Hamiltons and Gibsons of Bringalbert, there being intermarriages later."

The railway reached the town in 1877, along with the local railway station which later became a hub of several branch lines until they closed in 1977 and 1979.

Heritage listings 
Hamilton contains a number of heritage-listed sites, including:
 43 Gray Street: Hamilton Mechanics Institute
 57 Gray Street: Hamilton Post Office
 Kennedy, Martin, French and Thompson Streets: Hamilton Botanic Gardens
 14 Tyers Street: Hamilton Tuberculosis Chalet
 2-16 Craig Street: Hamilton Gas Holder
 34 Thompson Street: Napier Club
 429 Henty Highway: Hamilton Racecourse Grandstand
 70 Rogers Road: Correagh
 Kent Road and Macarthur Street: Myrniong

Industry and employment
Sheep grazing and agriculture are the primary industries in the surrounding shire, the area producing as much as 15% of Australia's total wool clip.   Inside the city of Hamilton the majority of employment is provided by the retail industry (20%) and the Health and Community Services sector (14.5%). Education is another large employer, with four Secondary Schools, two of which enrol both primary and secondary students, as well as a number of stand-alone primary schools. The unemployment rate at the 2001 Census was put at 6.1%, with a workforce participation rate of 58.9%.

Climate
Like most of South Western Victoria, Hamilton has a cool oceanic climate (Köppen climate classification Cfb) with some characteristics of a Warm-summer Mediterranean climate (Csb). Cold fronts regularly sweep in from the Southern Ocean. Although daytime temperatures occasionally reach into the 30s even 40s during summer, maximum temperatures in the mid teens will often linger until November and are not uncommon even during the summer months. On average Hamilton has 105 days per year with more than 1 mm of rain with a marked minimum during Summer.

Media

Newspaper
Hamilton and the surrounding areas is serviced by The Hamilton Spectator, a tri-weekly local newspaper published by the Spectator Observer newspaper group. Established in 1859 as the Hamilton Courier, it became the Hamilton Spectator and Grange District Advertiser in 1860, and later The Hamilton Spectator.

Radio
There are two radio stations based in Hamilton:
 3HA
 Mixx FM

Both are owned by the Ace Radio network, which operates radio stations in the Western District of Victoria.

Several other radio stations broadcast into Hamilton, including national broadcasters such as the ABC and regional stations based in nearby towns in Western Victoria such as Warrnambool, Portland, and Ballarat.

Attractions and events

In 1881 William Guilfoyle, the director of the Royal Botanic Gardens, Melbourne was employed to design the Hamilton Botanic Gardens. The National Trust of Australia classified the gardens in 1990 with eight tree species listed on the Register of Significant Trees in Victoria.

Hamilton Gallery Established in 1961, Hamilton Gallery's renowned collection features collection of gouache and watercolour pictures by English landscape painter Paul Sandby (1731-1809).

Sheepvention, a wool-related trade-show and exhibition is held in the Hamilton Show-grounds in the first Monday & Tuesday of August each year, and attracts up to 20,000 visitors.  It has a similar feel to an Agricultural show but is focused on wool and sheep.  The Hamilton Agricultural Show is normally held in November.

The Big Wool Bales was an attraction (now closed) consisting of five linked structures designed to resemble five gigantic woolbales - a tribute to the importance of the local wool industry. Together they formed a building and a cafe containing wool-related displays such as historical memorabilia, including farming and shearing equipment, wool scales, old horse harnesses, wool presses and weaving looms, along with wool samples and rural clothing.

The Keeping Place is a small museum and living history centre run by local indigenous people.

The Sir Reginald Ansett Transport Museum celebrates the founding of Ansett Australia in Hamilton in 1935 and displays items from the early days of the Ansett Airlines' operation.

Sport
There are many sporting clubs and leagues in the Hamilton area. The town is served by one Australian rules football team; Hamilton Kangaroos . This team competes in the Hampden Football League. 
The town formerly had 2 teams, Hamilton Magpies and Hamilton Imperials, which played in the Western Border Football League. The teams agreed to merge at the end of the 2012 season in order to make the move to the Hampden Football League.

Netball, field hockey, basketball, soccer, tennis and cricket are other popular sports in the town. Hamilton opened a large Indoor Sports and Aquatic Centre in March 2006, which contains four basketball courts, a twenty-five-metre indoor swimming pool, 4  squash courts, a table tennis centre with 8 courts and a large gym. The city is also the home of the  Hamilton Rowing Club (HRC) who compete in Rowing Victoria regattas during the summer. The Hamilton and Alexandra College Rowing Club (HACRC) sometimes compete in such events or attempt to train. Tucked behind the Historical Society in Gray Street, is the Hamilton 8-Ball and Snooker Club.

Hamilton has a horse racing club, the Hamilton Racing Club, which schedules around nine race meetings a year including the Hamilton Cup meeting in April. As well as a harness racing club which has recently opened a new track, with state-of-the-art facilities.
 
Golfers play at the Hamilton Golf Club or at the more minor course Parklands on Boundary and Hensley Park Roads.

Wildlife and parks 
The eastern barred bandicoot is native to the area, and a reserve has been built to protect the endangered species. In more recent times (2007), the numbers both within the reserve and without have been severely diminished to the point of near extinction as a result of extended drought.  Within the city the public lands adjoining the river and Lake Hamilton have been subject to spasmodic tree-planting projects.

Education
Primary schools in Hamilton include Hamilton (Gray Street) Primary School, George Street Primary School, Hamilton North Primary School and Saint Mary's Primary School.  Secondary schools include Hamilton and Alexandra College, Baimbridge College and Monivae College. There are two Primary to Year 12 schools: Hamilton and Alexandra College and Good Shepherd College.

Hamilton Special School caters to primary school-age students who have special education needs, predominantly autistic spectrum disorders and communication difficulties.

South West Institute of Technical and Further Education (TAFE) has a campus in Hamilton, offering post-secondary and trade courses and qualifications. 
RMIT maintains a training and research site 4 km from the centre of Hamilton, which is home to the Potter Rural Community Research Network. Vocational training at the site is delivered by South West TAFE while master's degrees and PhDs by research are facilitated by RMIT.

Prominent people
 Sir Reginald Ansett, founder of Ansett Airways, started his first air service in Hamilton in 1936.
 Mark Day, born 1943, prominent journalist, publisher and editor-in-chief of The Australian. At Hamilton High School edited the school magazine - The Grange - in the late 1950s.
 Pat Dodson, Australian Labor Party Senator for Western Australia, attended Monivae College.
 Alfred Dunbavin Butcher, biologist, manager of natural resources and public servant, was born in Hamilton in 1915.
 Malcolm Fraser, a former Prime Minister of Australia and the former member for Wannon, lived at "Nareen" a station near Hamilton.
 David Hawker, former speaker for the Australian Parliament and former member for Wannon 1983 - 2010.
 Edward Kenna, the last living Australian Second World War recipient of the Victoria Cross, born 1919 in Hamilton.
 Mark Orval, a former Australian rules footballer, also known as #angrydad.
 Liam Picken, born August 1986 is an Australian Rules football player. Picken began playing for Western Bulldogs in 2009 and in 2016 he played in the Bulldogs' premiership team.
 Xavier Samuel, actor, born 1983 in Hamilton.
 Clive Shields, medical practitioner and politician, born 1879. 
 Jan Smithwick, Australian basketball player was born in Hamilton in 1952.
 Melissa Tapper, born 1990, an Australian table tennis player, the first Australian athlete to qualify for the Summer Olympics and Summer Paralympics.
 Howard Taylor, artist
 Sir Winton Turnbull, an auctioneer and a politician, born 1899.
 Phil Walsh, a VFL/AFL footballer and coach, was born and raised in Hamilton.
 Emma Kearney AFLW and Women's Big Bash League player

See also
 Hamilton Airport

Notes

References
Ian Clark, Scars in the Landscape: A Register of Massacre Sites in Western Victoria, 1803-1859 (Canberra: AIATSIS, 1995).
"Dundas Shire Centenary 1863-1963" - Book compiled and published by the Hamilton Spectator for the Dundas Shire Council, 1963.

External links

Southern Grampians Shire Council (inc Hamilton)
The Department for Victorian Communities - Southern Grampians
The Department of Sustainability and the Environment - Hamilton Statistics
The People's Voice: Australian Community History Online - Hamilton
Sheepvention
The Sir Reginald Ansett Transport Museum
Hamilton Warriors Baseball CLub Inc. 

 
Towns in Victoria (Australia)
Western District (Victoria)
1851 establishments in Australia